In Ohio, State Route 250 may refer to:
U.S. Route 250 in Ohio, the only Ohio highway numbered 250 since about 1928
Ohio State Route 250 (1920s), now SR 226